Anolis meridionalis is a species of lizard in the family Dactyloidae. The species is found in Brazil, Paraguay, and Bolivia.

References

Anoles
Reptiles described in 1885
Reptiles of Brazil
Reptiles of Paraguay
Reptiles of Bolivia
Taxa named by Oskar Boettger